Daniel Riedo (born 22 February 1942) is a retired Swiss sprinter. He competed at the 1968 Summer Olympics in the 110m hurdles but was eliminated in a semifinal.

References

1942 births
Living people
Swiss male hurdlers
Olympic athletes of Switzerland
Athletes (track and field) at the 1968 Summer Olympics
Sportspeople from the canton of Fribourg